Kingsley Eduwo (born 19 June 1996) is a Nigerian international footballer who plays for Al-Arabi SC as a striker.

Career
Born in Lagos, Eduwo has played club football for Gateway United, Sunshine Stars, Lobi Stars, CS Sfaxien, Al-Najaf and Al Urooba.

He made his international debut for Nigeria in 2017.

International goals
Scores and results list Nigeria's goal tally first.

References

1996 births
Living people
Nigerian footballers
Nigeria international footballers
Gateway United F.C. players
Sunshine Stars F.C. players
Lobi Stars F.C. players
CS Sfaxien players
Najaf FC players
Al Urooba Club players
Espérance Sportive de Tunis players
Tunisian Ligue Professionnelle 1 players
Iraqi Premier League players
UAE Pro League players
Association football forwards
Nigerian expatriate footballers
Nigerian expatriate sportspeople in Tunisia
Expatriate footballers in Tunisia
Expatriate footballers in Kuwait
Nigerian expatriate sportspeople in Iraq
Nigerian expatriate sportspeople in Kuwait
Expatriate footballers in Iraq
Nigerian expatriate sportspeople in the United Arab Emirates
Expatriate footballers in the United Arab Emirates
Sportspeople from Lagos
Al-Arabi SC (Kuwait) players
Kuwait Premier League